Sean Wing (born July 10, 1982, in Las Vegas) is a singer and American film and television actor who first appeared on an episode of the CBS series Touched by an Angel. He may be best known for his roles as Glenn in the HBO comedy series Hello Ladies and Chad Griffin in the ABC series The Whole Truth.

Career 
In 2000, Wing appeared in a single episode of the CBS drama Touched by an Angel as Zack Collier. That was followed by a leading role in the TV series Beautiful People as Chris Prichett for ABC Family. He played Charlie in the 2010 romantic comedy film You Again co-starring Kristen Bell and Odette Yustman.

In 2010, he joined the lead cast of the ABC legal drama series The Whole Truth as Chad Griffin.  The series was canceled after seven episodes aired and did not get renewed for a second season.

In 2010, Wing appeared in the Broadway production of Green Day's rock musical American Idiot.

In 2012 Wing was reported that he signed a contract to join the CW hit teen series 90210 playing Nick as a recurring character.

In 2013 joined the cast of Hello Ladies, the HBO comedy series by Stephen Merchant, as a recurring guest star, playing the character of Glenn the douchey agent.

In 2014, Wing appeared as Glenn in the Hello Ladies follow-up movie special on HBO.

In 2016, Wing wrote, produced and starred in the short film I Know Jake Gyllenhaal is Going to Fuck my Girlfriend

In 2016, he composed the score for and starred in "Fired on Mars" animation. Winner of Vimeo's Best of the Year

In 2018, Wing's short film I Know Jake Gyllenhaal is Going to Fuck my Girlfriend is selected one of the top ten short films of 2018 by filmshortage.com

In 2019, the short film A Play that Wing co-wrote, produced and starred in wins Mammoth Film Festival's Best Short Film and Best Writing

In 2019, he composed the music for and starred in "Wet City" on Adult Swim

Filmography

Television

References

External links 
 

Living people
1982 births